The Bukit Badak Komuter station is a commuter train halt located in the eastern outskirts of Klang, Selangor, Malaysia which is served by the Port Klang Line of the KTM Komuter railway system.

Location
This station is located in an isolated neighbourhood (Malay villages) with very few shoplots or facilities nearby. There is an electricity generating plant nearby by Tenaga Nasional Berhad (TNB), as well as some second-hand car dealerships.

Visitors are advised to be careful while visiting this station especially at night.

Facilities
This station has no toilets provided, and the officer in charge of selling tickets will leave after office hours. However, since September 2018, KTM Komuter has adopted a fully cashless ticketing system, where only Touch 'n Go or KTMB's in-house Komuter Link cards are accepted. Self-service machines for reloading and purchasing Komuter Link cards are available.

Pay Parking is provided at an empty lot beside the station. However, the safety of visitors' vehicles at the parking is questionable as there were cases where cars were stolen. (Now, February 2020, it has been gated and has CCTV watching).  

Railway stations in Selangor
Port Klang Line